Trachymyrmex septentrionalis is a species of ant in the subfamily Myrmicinae. It is the northernmost species in the tribe Attini.

Distribution
The species is common in eastern United States, where it inhabits sandy soils. It is the most widely distributed fungus-growing ant in the United States, known from Texas to Florida, north to Illinois, Ohio and New York. The species has been identified in Durango, Mexico, but these records are likely that of the very similar Trachymyrmex carinatus.

References

External links

Myrmicinae
Hymenoptera of North America
Insects described in 1881
Insects of the United States